Horseshoe Bend is a city in Fulton, Izard, and Sharp counties in the U.S. state of Arkansas.  The population was 2,184 at the 2010 census. It is named for the large loop or horseshoe bend in the nearby Strawberry River.

Geography
Sunshine, fishing, and golf in Arkansas best kept secret in northern Arkansas is Horseshoe Bend. Nestled in the Ozark Mountain on the Strawberry River, this quaint town is the perfect place to find rest, relaxation, and recreation. 

The crown jewel of Horseshoe is 640-acre Crown Lake. On Crown Lake, water lovers can participate in a variety of activities, including swimming, kayaking, paddle boarding, water skiing, and tubing. Crown Lake is best known for good fishing, but it is not the only sought-after fishing hole in the area. Besides Crown Lake and the Strawberry River, fishing enthusiasts can also visit one of the smaller fishing lakes – Diamond Lake, Pioneer Lake, and North Lake.

There are plenty of activities for young and old alike! Golfers have their choice between two 18-hole golf courses. As well as bowling, pitch horseshoes, and play miniature golf. The town has several stores, a library, three resorts, a community theater, a spa, and several restaurants.

The citizens of Horseshoe Bend take pride in the community spirit and the ability to offer a memorable experience for all who come to visit. The Music in the Mountains show occurs every third Saturday of the month, and during summer, the Farmers’ Market occurs every Wednesday. Every year, the town celebrates Dogwood Days on the second Saturday of May, and Independence Day is celebrated every 4th of July with a parade and fireworks. The annual Christmas parade occurs on the first Saturday in December. There are many more events that happen throughout the year, thanks to the numerous civic groups which are active in Horseshoe Bend. All of these events embrace the unique Ozark culture of small-town pride and fellowship.

Horseshoe Bend is accessible to the state’s most scenic highways. The town is centrally located and just a 3-hour drive to Little Rock, Memphis, and Springfield. With its gorgeous views, slower pace of life, and laid-back charm, Horseshoe Bend is the perfect place to stay a week or a lifetime..

Demographics

2020 census

As of the 2020 United States census, there were 2,440 people, 1,028 households, and 616 families residing in the city.

2000 census
As of the census of 2000, there were 2,278 people, 1,142 households, and 725 families residing in the city. The racial makeup of the city was 97.28% White, 0.22% Black or African American, 0.88% Native American, 0.13% Asian, 0.04% Pacific Islander, 0.40% from other races, and 1.05% from two or more races.  1.23% of the population were Hispanic or Latino of any race.

There were 1,142 households, out of which 11.6% had children under the age of 18 living with them, 56.7% were married couples living together, 4.6% had a female householder with no husband present, and 36.5% were non-families. 33.8% of all households were made up of individuals, and 24.3% had someone living alone who was 65 years of age or older.  The average household size was 1.95 and the average family size was 2.42.

In the city, the population was spread out, with 12.8% under the age of 18, 3.4% from 18 to 24, 13.5% from 25 to 44, 24.6% from 45 to 64, and 45.7% who were 65 years of age or older.  The median age was 63 years. For every 100 females, there were 86.9 males.  For every 100 females age 18 and over, there were 84.2 males.

The median income for a household in the city was $26,714, and the median income for a family was $34,129. Males had a median income of $24,286 versus $17,688 for females. The per capita income for the city was $18,987.  About 6.9% of families and 10.8% of the population were below the poverty line, including 26.7% of those under age 18 and 2.6% of those age 65 or over.

Government

City government
City government is a mayor-council government. It consists of a mayor and eight council members representing four wards.

City Court
The City Court has jurisdiction over misdemeanor, criminal, traffic and municipal ordinance violations and cases that occur within the city.

Municipal services

Police
The Horseshoe Bend Police Department was disbanded in 2013, its duties assumed by the Izard County Sheriff's office.

Fire
The Horseshoe Bend Volunteer Fire Department consists of 12 volunteers and covers 45 square miles of residential and commercial properties as well as wetlands. The Department is responsible for fire suppression, extrication assistance, HAZMAT, and rescue. Equipment includes one engine / pumper, one tanker, one brush / quick-attack vehicle, and one emergency rescue vehicle. The department currently has an Insurance Services Office, Inc. (ISO) Public Protection Classification (PPC™) Service rating of 6.

Water / Sewer

Animal Control
Animal Control maintains a facility where lost dogs and cats are kept for adoption. It is staffed by employees and volunteers. A five-day waiting period is observed with the hopes that the pet will be reunited with its owner. Animals must be spayed / neutered and vaccinated prior to adoption. Assistance with these fees is available through the Friends of Horseshoe Bend Animals.

Library
The Horseshoe Bend Library was created in 1974, evolving from bookmobile service from the White Country Regional Library in Batesville, Arkansas that began in 1970. The library was originally housed in the Municipal Building. In 2006, the Library relocated to its new facility on Club Rd. The Library serves the city and surrounding area with services such as audio / visual equipment, computer and Internet access, a media / meeting room, and traditional reading materials. The library is supported by Friends of the Library. Library grounds are maintained by Izard Country Master Gardeners.

Transportation

Major highways
  Arkansas Highway 289
  Arkansas Highway 354

Airport
The Horseshoe Bend Airport, FAA identifier is 6M2, is owned and operated by the city. The runway is 4,524 ft. x 60 ft. and is paved. It is located at  (36.2213694, -91.7554833) at an elevation of 782 ft. / 238 m. Its variation is 03E.

See also
 List of cities in Arkansas

References

External links

 
 Encyclopedia of Arkansas History & Culture
 Horseshoe Bend Regional Directory

Cities in Izard County, Arkansas
Cities in Fulton County, Arkansas
Cities in Sharp County, Arkansas
Cities in Arkansas
Populated places established in 1963